Old Sarum was from 1295 to 1832 a parliamentary constituency of England (until 1707), of Great Britain (until 1800), and finally of the United Kingdom of Great Britain and Ireland.  It was a so-called rotten borough, with an extremely small electorate that was consequently vastly over-represented and could be used by a patron to gain undue influence. The constituency was on the site of what had been the original settlement of Salisbury, known as Old Sarum. The population and cathedral city had moved in the 14th century to New Sarum, at the foot of the Old Sarum hill.  The constituency was abolished under the Reform Act 1832.

History
In 1295, during the reign of King Edward I, Old Sarum was given the right to send two members to the House of Commons of England even though the site had ceased to be a city with the dissolution of Old Sarum Cathedral in 1226. The seat of the Bishop had moved to New Salisbury – and the location of the new cathedral – in 1217–18. All that remained at Old Sarum was a small hamlet. But that was largely abandoned when Edward II ordered the castle's demolition in 1322. The remains of the old settlement were razed for its materials that were used to construct the new city and Salisbury Cathedral. Evidence of quarrying showed it continued well into the 14th century. Two hundred years later Henry VIII sold the former Royal Castle to Thomas Compton.

Despite having no significant population, the borough was organised with a burgage franchise, meaning that the inhabitants of designated houses (burgage tenements) had the right to vote. From at least the 17th century, Old Sarum had no resident voters, but the landowner retained the right to nominate tenants for each of the burgage plots, and they were not required to live there. For many years, the borough was owned by the Pitt family and was their pocket borough: one of its Members in the late 18th century was William Pitt the Elder. In 1802, the head of the family, Lord Camelford, sold the borough to the Earl of Caledon, who owned it until its abolition; the price was reported as £60,000, even though the land and manorial rights were worth £700 a year at most: an indication of the value of a pair of parliamentary seats. At its final election, in 1831, there were eleven voters, all of whom were landowners who lived elsewhere. This made Old Sarum the most notorious of the rotten boroughs, being described as "a wall with two niches". The Reform Act 1832 subsumed the Old Sarum area into an enlarged borough of Wilton.

In the last years, the spectacle of an Old Sarum election drew a small crowd to observe the ritual presentation of the two candidates and the hollow call for any further nominations. Stooks Smith quotes a contemporary description dating from the 1802 general election:

Place of election
Elections in Old Sarum were conducted on a mobile hustings under a specific tree, which died in 1905, in what was known as the 'electing acre'.

Members of Parliament

1295–1640

1640–1832

Elections

The last reported contested election in Old Sarum occurred at a by-election in November 1751, after the death of Paul Jodrell. The proprietor at the time, Thomas Pitt, had sold the privilege of choosing the Members to the Pelham Government for £2,000 and a pension of £1,000 a year, but the administration's choice of Simon Fanshawe was opposed by James Pitt (younger brother of George Pitt, Member for Dorset) and by John Thorold. The number of votes for each candidate was not recorded.

See also
 Unreformed House of Commons

Notes and references
Notes 
  
References

References

D Brunton & D H Pennington, Members of the Long Parliament (London: George Allen & Unwin, 1954)
Cobbett's Parliamentary history of England, from the Norman Conquest in 1066 to the year 1803 (London: Thomas Hansard, 1808) 
 Smith, Henry Stooks (1844–1850) The Parliaments of England from 1715 to 1847, in 3 Volumes, London: Simpkin & Marshall, republished Craig, F.W.S. (ed.) (1973), Chichester : Political Reference Publications, 

Parliamentary constituencies in Wiltshire (historic)
Constituencies of the Parliament of the United Kingdom established in 1295
Constituencies of the Parliament of the United Kingdom disestablished in 1832
Rotten boroughs
Members of Parliament for Old Sarum